Peyman Shirzadi (born August 25, 1988 in Tehran, Iran) is an Iranian Football defender who most recently played for Iranian football club Foolad in the Persian Gulf Pro League.

Career
Shirzadi left Foolad in mid January.

Club career
Shirzadi signed his first professional contract in 2015 and has played for Esteghlal Khuzestan.

Honours

Club
Esteghlal Khuzestan
Persian Gulf Pro League (1) : 2015–16

References

External links
 
 Peyman Shirzadi at PersianLeague.com
 پیمان شیرزادی  at iranleague.ir

1988 births
Living people
Iranian footballers
Niroye Zamini players
Mes Sarcheshme players
Esteghlal Ahvaz players
Mes Rafsanjan players
Esteghlal Khuzestan players
Association football fullbacks
Shahin Bushehr F.C. players